In control theory and signal processing, a linear, time-invariant system is said to be minimum-phase if the system and its inverse are causal and stable.

The most general causal LTI transfer function can be uniquely factored into a series of an all-pass and a minimum phase system. The system function is then the product of the two parts, and in the time domain the response of the system is the convolution of the two part responses. The difference between a minimum phase and a general transfer function is that a minimum phase system has all of the poles and zeroes of its transfer function in the left half of the s-plane representation (in discrete time, respectively, inside the unit circle of the z-plane). Since inverting a system function leads to poles turning to zeroes and vice versa, and poles on the right side (s-plane imaginary line) or outside (z-plane unit circle) of the complex plane lead to unstable systems, only the class of minimum phase systems is closed under inversion. Intuitively, the minimum phase part of a general causal system implements its amplitude response with minimum group delay, while its all pass part corrects its phase response alone to correspond with the original system function.

The analysis in terms of poles and zeroes is exact only in the case of transfer functions which can be expressed as ratios of polynomials. In the continuous time case, such systems translate into networks of conventional, idealized LCR networks. In discrete time, they conveniently translate into approximations thereof, using addition, multiplication, and unit delay. It can be shown that in both cases, system functions of rational form with increasing order can be used to efficiently approximate any other system function; thus even system functions lacking a rational form, and so possessing an infinitude of poles and/or zeroes, can in practice be implemented as efficiently as any other.

In the context of causal, stable systems, we would in theory be free to choose whether the zeroes of the system function are outside of the stable range (to the right or outside) if the closure condition wasn't an issue. However, inversion is of great practical importance, just as theoretically perfect factorizations are in their own right. (Cf. the spectral symmetric/antisymmetric decomposition as another important example, leading e.g. to Hilbert transform techniques.) Many physical systems also naturally tend towards minimum phase response, and sometimes have to be inverted using other physical systems obeying the same constraint.

Insight is given below as to why this system is called minimum-phase, and why the basic idea applies even when the system function cannot be cast into a rational form that could be implemented.

Inverse system 

A system  is invertible if we can uniquely determine its input from its output. (See Inverse matrix for a finite-dimensional analog). That is,

Suppose that  is input to system  and gives output .

Applying the inverse system  to  gives the following

So we see that the inverse system  allows us to determine uniquely the input  from the output .

Discrete-time example 

Additionally, suppose  has impulse response . The cascade of two LTI systems is a convolution. In this case, the above relation is the following:

where  is the Kronecker delta or the identity system in the discrete-time case. Note that this inverse system  need not be unique.

Minimum phase system 

When we impose the constraints of causality and stability, the inverse system is unique; and the system  and its inverse  are called minimum-phase. The causality and stability constraints in the discrete-time case are the following (for time-invariant systems where  is the system's impulse response):

Causality 

and

Stability 

and

See the article on stability for the analogous conditions for the continuous-time case.

Frequency analysis

Discrete-time frequency analysis 

Performing frequency analysis for the discrete-time case will provide some insight. The time-domain equation is the following:

Applying the Z-transform gives the following relation in the z-domain

From this relation, we realize that

For simplicity, we consider only the case of a rational transfer function . Causality and stability imply that all poles of  must be strictly inside the unit circle (See stability). Suppose

Causality and stability imply that the poles – the roots of  – must be strictly inside the unit circle. We also know that

So, causality and stability for  imply that its poles – the roots of  – must be inside the unit circle. These two constraints imply that both the zeros and the poles of a minimum phase system must be strictly inside the unit circle.

Continuous-time frequency analysis 

Analysis for the continuous-time case proceeds in a similar manner except that we use the Laplace transform for frequency analysis. The time-domain equation is the following.

where  is the Dirac delta function. The Dirac delta function is the identity operator in the continuous-time case because of the sifting property with any signal .

Applying the Laplace transform gives the following relation in the s-plane.

From this relation, we realize that

Again, for simplicity, we consider only the case of a rational transfer function . Causality and stability imply that all poles of  must be strictly inside the left-half s-plane (See stability). Suppose

Causality and stability imply that the poles – the roots of  – must be inside the left-half s-plane. We also know that

So, causality and stability for  imply that its poles – the roots of  – must be strictly inside the left-half s-plane. These two constraints imply that both the zeros and the poles of a minimum phase system must be strictly inside the left-half s-plane.

Relationship of magnitude response to phase response 

A minimum-phase system, whether discrete-time or continuous-time, has an additional useful property that the natural logarithm of the magnitude of the frequency response (the "gain" measured in nepers which is proportional to dB) is related to the phase angle of the frequency response (measured in radians) by the Hilbert transform.  That is, in the continuous-time case, let

be the complex frequency response of system .

where  denotes the Hilbert transform, and, inversely,

Stated more compactly, let

Then

and

The Hilbert transform operator is defined to be

An equivalent corresponding relationship is also true for discrete-time minimum-phase systems.

Minimum phase in the time domain 

For all causal and stable systems that have the same magnitude response, the minimum phase system has its energy concentrated near the start of the impulse response. i.e., it minimizes the following function which we can think of as the delay of energy in the impulse response.

Minimum phase as minimum group delay 

For all causal and stable systems that have the same magnitude response, the minimum phase system has the minimum group delay. The following proof illustrates this idea of minimum group delay.

Suppose we consider one zero  of the transfer function . Let's place this zero  inside the unit circle and see how the group delay is affected.

Since the zero  contributes the factor  to the transfer function, the phase contributed by this term is the following.

 contributes the following to the group delay.

Thus, having  inside the unit circle minimizes the group delay contributed by the factor . We can extend this result to the general case of more than one zero since the phase of the multiplicative factors of the form  is additive. I.e., for a transfer function with  zeros,

So, a minimum phase system with all zeros inside the unit circle minimizes the group delay since the group delay of each individual zero is minimized.

Non-minimum phase 

Systems that are causal and stable whose inverses are causal and unstable are known as non-minimum-phase systems. A given non-minimum phase system will have a greater phase contribution than the minimum-phase system with the equivalent magnitude response.

Maximum phase 

A maximum-phase system is the opposite of a minimum phase system. A causal and stable LTI system is a maximum-phase system if its inverse is causal and unstable. That is,
 The zeros of the discrete-time system are outside the unit circle.
 The zeros of the continuous-time system are in the right-hand side of the complex plane.
Such a system is called a maximum-phase system because it has the maximum group delay of the set of systems that have the same magnitude response. In this set of equal-magnitude-response systems, the maximum phase system will have maximum energy delay.

For example, the two continuous-time LTI systems described by the transfer functions

have equivalent magnitude responses; however, the second system has a much larger contribution to the phase shift. Hence, in this set, the second system is the maximum-phase system and the first system is the minimum-phase system. These systems are also famously known as nonminimum-phase systems that raise many stability concerns in control. One recent solution to these systems is moving the RHP zeros to the LHP using the PFCD method.

Mixed phase 

A mixed-phase system has some of its zeros inside the unit circle and has others outside the unit circle. Thus, its group delay is neither minimum or maximum but somewhere between the group delay of the minimum and maximum phase equivalent system.

For example, the continuous-time LTI system described by transfer function

is stable and causal; however, it has zeros on both the left- and right-hand sides of the complex plane. Hence, it is a mixed-phase system. To control the transfer functions that include these systems some methods such as internal model controller (IMC), generalized Smith's predictor (GSP) and parallel feedforward control with derivative (PFCD) are proposed.

Linear phase 

A linear-phase system has constant group delay. Non-trivial linear phase or nearly linear phase systems are also mixed phase.

See also
 All-pass filter A special non-minimum-phase case.
 Kramers–Kronig relation Minimum phase system in physics

References

Further reading

Dimitris G. Manolakis, Vinay K. Ingle, Stephen M. Kogon : Statistical and Adaptive Signal Processing, pp. 54–56, McGraw-Hill, 
Boaz Porat : A Course in Digital Signal Processing, pp. 261–263, John Wiley and Sons, 

Digital signal processing
Control theory